The Montgomery Brothers were a jazz trio consisting of the brothers Wes Montgomery (electric guitar, 1923–1968), Buddy Montgomery (piano, vibraphone, 1930–2009) and Monk Montgomery (electric bass, double bass, 1921–1982).  

During the mid-1950s, they were members of the Montgomery-Johnson Quintet with Alonzo Johnson and Robert "Sonny" Johnson. 

Recordings from these early years, including sessions produced by Quincy Jones in 1955, were released later, most notably as Wes Montgomery's In The Beginning (Resonance, 2015). 

From 1957–1960, they recorded as the Mastersounds, then as the Montgomery Brothers.

Discography
1957: The Montgomery Brothers and Five Others (Pacific Jazz)
1960: Montgomeryland (Pacific Jazz)
1961: Groove Yard (Riverside)
1961: The Montgomery Brothers (Fantasy)
1961: The Montgomery Brothers in Canada (Fantasy)
1961: Love Walked In (Jazzland)
1961: Wes, Buddy and Monk Montgomery (Pacific Jazz)
1961: George Shearing and the Montgomery Brothers (Jazzland)

References

American jazz ensembles from Indiana
Hard bop ensembles
Musical groups from Indianapolis
Columbia Records artists
Riverside Records artists
Sibling musical trios